The San Diego Surfers Women's Rugby Club is a women's rugby union club based in San Diego, California. They were founded in 1975 as an amateur club and have been members of the Women's Premier League Rugby (WPL) since 2011, when the team earned promotion from Division I. The Surfers field three teams throughout the year, one each in the WPL, Division I, and in Sevens. 

The Surfers achievements include having won the WPL National Championship in 2016 and 2018, and the USA Rugby Club 7s National Championship in 2012, 2014, 2018 and 2019.

References

External links 

 Official site

Women's Premier League Rugby teams
Women's sports in California
Rugby union teams in San Diego
Rugby clubs established in 1975
1975 establishments in California